Novomer is a venture-funded chemistry technology development company.  Its core technology is a proprietary catalyst that enables carbon monoxide and ethylene oxide to be used as raw materials in the production of polymers and chemicals.

References

External links

Bioplastics